Ahmet Demir (born 15 February 1967) is a Turkish alpine skier. He competed at the 1988 Winter Olympics and the 1992 Winter Olympics.

References

1967 births
Living people
Turkish male alpine skiers
Olympic alpine skiers of Turkey
Alpine skiers at the 1988 Winter Olympics
Alpine skiers at the 1992 Winter Olympics
Place of birth missing (living people)
20th-century Turkish people